Sącz Lachs are a group of ethnic Poles who live in southern Lesser Poland. They are associated with the territory of Sącz Region, especially Nowy Sącz County, Kotlina Sądecka, and parts of Carpathian Uplands and Beskids.

Lachy is the plural of Lach, a term for ethnic Poles. Lach is ultimately derived from the name of the ancient Polish tribe of Lendians. Sądeckie is an adjective referring to the region where they live.

Sądecki Lachs culture is featured in Muzeum Lachów Sądeckich in Podegrodzie, Lesser Poland Voivodeship and Sądecki Ethnographic Park (open-air museum) in Nowy Sącz.

Notes 

Sacz Lachs